Cymatura manowi is a species of beetle in the family Cerambycidae. It was described by Franz in 1954. It is known from Mozambique, Kenya, Malawi, Tanzania, South Africa, and possibly Somalia and Uganda.

References

Xylorhizini
Beetles described in 1954